The women's 200m T44 event at the 2008 Summer Paralympics took place at the Beijing National Stadium on 9 September. There were no heats in this event.

Final

Competed at 18:08.

DQ = Disqualified.

References
 
 

W
2008 in women's athletics